The Man in the Sky (released in the U.S. as Decision Against Time) is a 1957 thriller drama film starring Jack Hawkins and produced by Ealing Films, Michael Balcon's new company, set up after Rank had sold Ealing Studios in Ealing Green, West London, to the BBC in 1955. Balcon, who had run the company on behalf of Rank since 1944, left Rank in 1956 and set up the new company, striking a distribution and production deal with MGM. This was the first Ealing production to be made at MGM-British Studios in Borehamwood, North London.

Plot
Test pilot John Mitchell is married, has two young sons, and lives in a rented semi-detached house in the suburbs of Wolverhampton. He disappoints his wife Mary by refusing to increase their bid to buy a house from £3,500 to the asking price of £4,000, which he says they cannot afford. What she does not know is that the aircraft manufacturing company he works for is in desperate financial straits. Owner Reginald Conway needs to convince potential buyer Ashmore to place an order soon or the firm will go bankrupt. Mitchell takes the only prototype of a new freight aeroplane for a flight, with Ashmore and several of Conway's employees aboard. It has the maximum cargo on board: three heavy vehicles including a Rolls-Royce. Ashmore explains he is close to accepting a deal. During testing, one engine catches fire.

Ashmore and the others parachute to safety over the airfield. Mitchell is able to extinguish the fire by diving the aeroplane, but loses half of his aileron control in the process. It is suggested to fly on for two hours to reduce the fuel. Then, despite Conway's order and the urgings of others, he decides to try to land the aeroplane rather than crashing it into the sea. However, he has to fly back and forth for half an hour to use up fuel, shifting the centre of gravity in the aircraft away from the dead engine to make the landing more feasible. Ashmore is convinced of the aircraft's value by its performance in the dive and expresses confidence in Mitchell's ability to land it.

A freelance journalist comes to the airfield to collect information for a story.  As he waits for the plane to use up enough fuel to try a landing, the journalist tries to sell the story to a newspaper and is told that they will pay him £50 for the story if the plane crashes, but if the pilot lands the plane safely the newspaper does not want the story.

During the tense wait, after all the others have rejected the idea as serving no purpose, office worker Mrs Snowden takes it upon herself to notify Mitchell's wife by phone, anyway. Mary goes to the airfield and watches as her husband undertakes the tricky landing. She gets a friend to drive her home so Mitch is unaware that she saw the whole thing. Later, at home, she demands to know why he risked his life when everyone told him to bail out. He explains that while he felt it was his duty with the company's fate hanging in the balance, he took the risk out of love and concern for the welfare of his family. Then he phones the estate agent and agrees to the seller's price of the house mentioned earlier.

Cast

Jack Hawkins as John "Mitch" Mitchell
Elizabeth Sellars as Mary Mitchell
Jeremy Bodkin as Nicholas Mitchell, John's young son
Gerard Lohan as Philip Mitchell, John's other young son
Walter Fitzgerald as Reginald Conway
John Stratton as Peter Hook
Eddie Byrne as Ashmore
Victor Maddern as Joe Biggs
Lionel Jeffries as Keith
Donald Pleasence as Crabtree
Catherine Lacey as Mary's Mother
Megs Jenkins as Mrs Snowden
Ernest Clark as Maine the designer
Raymond Francis as Jenkins
Russell Waters as Sim
Howard Marion-Crawford as Ingrams, a freelance journalist

Production
Much of the filming of The Man in the Sky was done at Pendeford airfield near Wolverhampton, now a housing estate.  The aircraft portraying the "Wolverhampton Freighter" was Bristol 170 Wayfarer Mk.IIA G-AIFV of Silver City Airways, a type that had actually been flying since 1946.  During filming, the aircraft overshot the runway, damaging the nose and wing. After filming, the aircraft returned to service with Silver City Airways until May 1962, when it was scrapped.

Reception
The Man in the Sky premiered in London at the Empire, Leicester Square on 24 January 1957, and the reviewer for The Times called it "an Ealing film with a difference". According to MGM records, The Man in the Sky earned $150,000 in the US and Canada and $350,000 elsewhere.

Charles Crichton felt the film "didn't do particuarly well" because "the climax was an emotional climax rather than a physical one." 

Aviation film historian Stephen Pendo in Aviation in the Cinema (1985)  considered The Man in the Sky as part of the lineage of the "test pilot-hero" films of the 1950s. Aviation film historian Michael Paris in From the Wright Brothers to Top Gun: Aviation, Nationalism, and Popular Cinema (1995) shared a similar perspective on the film.

See also
 List of American films of 1957

References

Notes

Citations

Bibliography

 Paris, Michael. From the Wright Brothers to Top Gun: Aviation, Nationalism, and Popular Cinema. Manchester, UK: Manchester University Press, 1995. .
 Pendo, Stephen. Aviation in the Cinema. Lanham, Maryland: Scarecrow Press, 1985. .

External links
 
 

1957 films
1957 drama films
1950s thriller drama films
1950s British films
1950s English-language films
British drama films
British aviation films
British black-and-white films
Ealing Studios films
Metro-Goldwyn-Mayer films
Films about test pilots
Films directed by Charles Crichton
Films produced by Michael Balcon
Films shot at MGM-British Studios